Poka is a work of science fiction written in Bengali by the Bengali novelist Premendra Mitra. This story was first published by Deb Sahitya Kutir, Kolkata, West Bengal, India, in the Puja Annual titled Abahon in 1948. It was the forth story in GhanaDa series, the first one being মশা (the mosquito) published in 1945. Ghanashyam Das, alias GhanaDa, the protagonist of the GhanaDa series of science-fiction novels written in Bengali is a fictional character created by Premendra Mitra.

Characterization
The character of Ghanashyam Das alias GhanaDa was outlined as a bachelor, dark complexioned male with tall, boney and skeletal structure, having age “anywhere between thirty five to fifty five”, as described by the author himself in Mosha, the first story of the Ghanada series. He stayed in the third floor attic of a shared apartment (মেস বাড়ি) at no. 72, Banamali Naskar Lane, Calcutta, West Bengal, India, along with other boarders, who called him Ghana-da, while the term “da” is a suffix added to the name of an elder male in Bengal to convey reverence and affection. Though he was rarely found engaged in any activity or work other than telling fantastic tales to the boarders of the apartment, his stories engaged him with most of the major events happened in the world for last two hundred years and there was no place on earth which he didn't visit. 

Premendra Mitra, the creator, described Ghana~da in an interview by A K Ganguly published in SPAN in 1974, as under:

Plot
GhanaDa was almost defeated. yes, because he had all capabilities to come out of the most difficult situations winning every time. All started on a Saturday night at no. 72, Bamamali Nasjar lane, when boarders went to sleep a little late after partying. At about midnight there was heard an inhuman blood chilling cry coming out of the third floor attic room of GhanaDa, followed by he himself recklessly running down the stairs. The worried boarders rushed out and asked eagerly, "What happened, GhanaDa?"  
Upon careful inspection the cause of all hue and cry was found. It was an insect!! When everyone started rolling over with laughter, GhanaDa remained indifferent and calm. Then he asked gravely, "Did you ever have to run after an insect for eight thousand miles? Did you ever have to storm your brain thinking what you would do with three thousand tons of dead insect? Did you ever happen to carry out a desperate search for an insect in the deadliest forests of Africa with a paper and a closed phial?” "Was it this insect, GhanaDa?” “No, that was Schistocerca gregaria." GhanaDa continued, "It was the 22nd December of 1931. The Riga of Latvia was covered under heavy snow, when I was returning from my morning walk…" and the story continues. At the end it was revealed how GhanaDa reached the basin of the river Bahr al-Arab in Sudan, Africa, in the land of Dinkas, in search of the mad scientist Jacob Rothstein. GhanaDa used a contagious biological agent to eradicate the swarm of deadly African desert locust weighing three thousand tons, and yet it was another instance he saved the mankind from an impending disaster.”

Characters
 Ghanashyam Das alias Ghanada
 Shibu
 Gour
 Shishir
 Author (anonymous in this story. However, now we know it was Sudhir)
 General Vornof
 Jacob Rothstein, the scientist

References

External links

1948 short stories
Indian short stories
Science fiction short stories
Short stories set in India
Ghanada short stories